Taite (called Taidu in Assyrian sources) was one of the capitals of the Mitanni Empire. Its exact location is still unknown, although it is speculated to be in the Khabur region. The site of Tell Hamidiya (Tall al-hamidiya) has recently been identified with ancient Taite by the Italian scholar Mirjo Salvini.

During the Fall of the Mitanni Empire, the conquering Assyrian ruler Adad-Nirari (1307–1275 BC or 1295–1263 BC) slaughtered the inhabitants. He sowed the grounds with salt.

See also
Cities of the ancient Near East

References
Seyyare Eichler, Tall Al-Hamidiya 1 Vorbericht 1984, Academic Press Fribourg, 1985, 
S. Eichler et al.,  Tall Al-Hamidiya 2 Vorbericht 1985-1987 - Symposium Recent Excavations in the Upper Khabur Region, Berne, December 9–11, 1986, Academic Press Fribourg, 1990, 
Markus Wafler, Tall al-Hamidiya 3 Zur historischen Geographie von Idamaras zur Zeit der Archive von Mari und Subat-enlil/Sehna, Academic Press Fribourg, 2001, 
Markus Wafler, Tall al-Hamidiya 4 Vorbericht 1988-2001, Academic Press Fribourg, 2004,

External links
 Swiss excavations at Tell al-Hamidiya

Archaeological sites in al-Hasakah Governorate
Hurrian cities
Former populated places in Southwest Asia